Julián Miralles is a former Grand Prix motorcycle racer from Spain. His son, Julián Miralles Rodríguez, is also a motorcycle racer.

Career statistics

By season

References

External links
 Profile on motogp.com

1965 births
Living people
Spanish motorcycle racers
125cc World Championship riders
500cc World Championship riders
80cc World Championship riders